Tom Martinsen (1943–2007) was a Norwegian photographer. 

Born in Tønsberg, he studied photography with Christer Strömholm in Stockholm, and was appointed as reporting photographer for the newspaper Dagbladet from 1973. He was a co-founder of the Oslo gallery  in 1977. His publications include the book 118 øyeblikk from 2003. 

Martinsen was awarded the Fritt Ord Honorary Award in 2006.

References

External links 

Tom Martinsen at fotografi.no
Tom Martinsen at Preus Museum

1943 births
2007 deaths
People from Tønsberg
Norwegian photographers